Moorefield High School is a high school located in Hardy County, West Virginia. It is one of two high schools located within Hardy County, the other being East Hardy High School. Moorefield High School was built in the late 1930s. Moorefield's colors are blue and gold and their mascot is the Yellowjackets, one among two schools in West Virginia to use this mascot (see Williamstown High School (WV)).

The building was renovated during 2013–2015.  In 2013, the last part of the oldest portion of the school, dating from 1941, was demolished.

Moorefield high school have won 6 football championships, 2 in baseball, and 1 in basketball. Moorefield biggest sports rivalry is East Hardy High school.

References

Schools in Hardy County, West Virginia
Public high schools in West Virginia